Francophone Nord-Ouest is a Canadian school district in New Brunswick.

Francophone Nord-Ouest is a Francophone district operating 21 public schools (gr. K-12) in Carleton, Victoria, Madawaska and Restigouche counties.

Current enrollment is approximately 7,000 students and 470 teachers. Francophone Nord-Ouest School District is headquartered in Edmundston.

See also
List of school districts in New Brunswick
List of schools in New Brunswick

References

 Official Website

Education in Carleton County, New Brunswick
Education in Edmundston
Education in Madawaska County, New Brunswick
Education in Restigouche County, New Brunswick
Education in Victoria County, New Brunswick
French-language school districts in Canada
School districts in New Brunswick